Ace of Cakes is an American reality television show that aired on the Food Network.  The show focused on the daily operations of Duff Goldman's custom cake shop, Charm City Cakes, in Baltimore, Maryland; including small-business ownership, working with various vendors, tasting with customers, constructing cakes, and delivering his products.

Synopsis

Ace of Cakes highlights the frantic activity encompassing the production of a substantial number of custom edible art cakes in a short period of time. The staff consists primarily of Duff Goldman's good friends who have varying personalities. They are frequently shown working long hours to build and decorate the cakes, yet are always making jokes to offset the alleged stress of hitting each deadline. Staff members sometimes drive the cakes to their final destinations, which can require road trips of several hundred miles. Goldman has an informal approach to running Charm City Cakes.  He is known for using non-traditional cooking utensils such as blowtorches, belt sanders, and power saws, and more to construct his designs.

Some of the notable cakes created by Charm City Cakes include cakes for the Preakness Stakes horse race at Pimlico in Maryland, Baltimore Zoo, the premiere of the 2007 film Hairspray, a replica of Radio City Music Hall for The Rockettes, a hatbox-shaped cake for an 80-year-old grandmother, the Hogwarts castle for the premiere of the fifth Harry Potter film in Los Angeles, an edible replica of Wrigley Field, a replica of the shark ray at the Newport Aquarium, a cake for the Paramount Pictures premiere of the DreamWorks Animation film Kung-Fu Panda, and a replica of the Hubble Space Telescope for NASA. For the season finale of Season 5, the bakery's staff traveled to Hawaii to create a cake for the 100th episode of Lost.

Episodes

Season one of Ace of Cakes consisted of six episodes airing in early fall 2006. The show proved to be one of the highest-rated prime time shows in Food Network's history, causing the network to order 15 episodes for season two including a 2-hour-long episode featuring the official NFL cake for Super Bowl XLI.  A one-hour special featured the show's first international delivery (to London, England) in an episode aired in December 2010. Season 10, planned to be the program's last (despite its popularity), premiered in January 2011 and had six episodes. The final episode featured a large-scale Delorean time machine cake created for Universal Studios' Back to the Future anniversary event in New York City.  Seasons 1–5 have been released on DVD.

Production

Ace of Cakes was shot on location at the bakery in Baltimore, Maryland, a converted church.  The show has also featured other locations where Duff, Geof and occasionally others travel to in delivery of cakes such as Los Angeles, Chicago, New York, Washington, D.C., Miami, Boston, Alaska, and Hawaii, among others. The show was edited in Los Angeles at the show's production company, Authentic Entertainment, a subsidiary of Endemol.

Reception 
During Season 8, Ace of Cakes launched a new promotion concept involving a deck of Las Vegas-style playing cards.

Ace of Cakes has been a very large success with fans and critics alike. The show has brought Food Network some of the highest ratings it has ever received for a prime-time program. Ace of Cakes is also broadcast in the United Kingdom on food network, in México and Latin America on FOXlife, in New Zealand on the Food Channel, in Australia on LifeStyle Food, and in Portugal on SIC Mulher.

On November 19, 2010, Food Network announced that the 10th season of Ace of Cakes would be its last. Season 10 began airing in January 2011, ending shortly thereafter in February.

In 2019, Food Network announced that Goldman would appear in a new series, Buddy vs. Duff, where he competes against Buddy Valastro of the similar TLC series Cake Boss (both networks are now owned by Discovery Inc.).

References

External links 

 
Ace of Cakes official website at Food Network
 

2000s American reality television series
2006 American television series debuts
2010s American reality television series
2011 American television series endings
English-language television shows
Food Network original programming
Food reality television series
Media about cakes
Television series by Authentic Entertainment
Television shows set in Baltimore